Abdul Masood (born 29 October 1979) is an Indian former cricketer. He played five first-class matches for Bengal between 1996 and 2000.

See also
 List of Bengal cricketers

References

External links
 

1979 births
Living people
Indian cricketers
Bengal cricketers
Cricketers from Kolkata